William Jordan Howard (December 31, 1799 – October 2, 1862), served as Mayor of Pittsburgh from 1845 to 1846.

Biography
Howard was born in Wilmington, Delaware and went to Queen Elizabeth Grammar School, Wakefield. He worked as a merchant. His business was destroyed in the Great Fire of April 10, 1845. The conflagration decimated one third of the city.

Mayor Howard's administration was dedicated to helping Pittsburgh to rise from her ashes. Howard also served for many years as the President of The Board of Guardians of the Poor.

See also 

 List of Mayors of Pittsburgh

References

External links 
 South Pittsburgh Development Corporation
 Political Graveyard

1799 births
1863 deaths
Mayors of Pittsburgh
People educated at Queen Elizabeth Grammar School, Wakefield
People from Wilmington, Delaware
Burials at Allegheny Cemetery
19th-century American politicians